Ian Barr is a Scottish former rugby union player. He was the 129th President of the Scottish Rugby Union; the 128th person to hold the office.

Rugby Union career

Amateur career

Barr had a number of clubs:- Esk Valley Banthams, Lasswade. West of Scotland, Stirling County, Edinburgh Academicals, Police Scotland, Selkirk, Musselburgh and Lasswade again. While at Musselburgh he suffered an injury which impacted his playing career, which made Barr finish his career at Lasswade. He also played for the East of Scotland College of Agriculture and Oatridge College.

Administrative career

He became a President of Lasswade and held that position for 15 years.

He was elected onto the Scottish Rugby Union council in 2012. He had two years on the SRU board from 2017. He was an Ambassador for the Scotland U20 from 2013 to 2017.

He was voted a Vice-President of the Scottish Rugby Union in 2018.

Barr became the 129th President of the Scottish Rugby Union in 2020. His term in office is scheduled to be from 2020 to 2022.

Coaching career

Barr is a qualified Strength and Conditioning Coach with the Scottish Rugby Union.

Outside of rugby union

Barr is a farmer who has a sportsground contracting business. He also works at Midlothian Council as a spin instructor.

References

1963 births
Living people
Rugby union players from Midlothian
Scottish rugby union players
Presidents of the Scottish Rugby Union
Edinburgh Academicals rugby union players
Musselburgh RFC players
Stirling County RFC players
West of Scotland FC players
Lasswade RFC players
Selkirk RFC players
Rugby union strength and conditioning coaches
Alumni of Scotland's Rural College